Roy Wallace McLeese III (born December 7, 1959) is an associate judge of the District of Columbia Court of Appeals, the highest appellate court for the District of Columbia. He received his Bachelor of Arts cum laude in 1981 from Harvard College, and his Juris Doctor cum laude in 1985 from the New York University School of Law, where he was editor-in-chief of the Law Review. He spent his legal career at the United States Department of Justice and the U.S. Attorney's office in the District of Columbia before his nomination to the bench by President Barack Obama in 2011.

See also 
 List of law clerks of the Supreme Court of the United States (Seat 9)

References

1959 births
Living people
21st-century American judges
Judges of the District of Columbia Court of Appeals
Harvard University alumni
Law clerks of the Supreme Court of the United States
New York University School of Law alumni
People from Evanston, Illinois